Ross Kettle (born 15 September 1961 in Durban, South Africa) is a South African actor, known for directing the play Soweto's Burning, and best known as Jeffrey Conrad in the NBC American television soap opera Santa Barbara.

In 1988, he was nominated for a Daytime Emmy Award for Outstanding Younger Actor in a Drama Series for his role on Santa Barbara.

Filmography

References

External links

Living people
White South African people
South African male soap opera actors
Actors from Durban
1961 births